Carlisi is a surname. Notable people with the surname include:

Olimpia Carlisi (born 1946), Italian stage, film, and television actress
Samuel Carlisi (1914–1997), American mobster

See also

Guido Carlesi (born 1936), Italian cyclist

Italian-language surnames
Patronymic surnames